Gaioz Jejelava (born 29 December 1914 in Tbilisi; died 16 March 2005 in Tbilisi) was a Soviet and Georgian football player.

Jejelava, a skillful winger, was one of the leaders of Dinamo Tbilisi alongside Boris Paichadze during 11 years spell with the club.

Later Jejelava managed VVS Moscow and Dinamo Tbilisi, but without any success, spending two seasons with each of the clubs.

Jejelava died in March 2005, in Tbilisi.

References

External links
  Footballfacts Profile
  Allfutbolist Profile
  Profile at National Parliamentary Library of Georgia

1914 births
2005 deaths
Soviet footballers
Footballers from Georgia (country)
Association football wingers
FC Dinamo Tbilisi players
Soviet Top League players
Footballers from Tbilisi
People from Tiflis Governorate
Honoured Masters of Sport of the USSR
Soviet football managers
Football managers from Georgia (country)
Recipients of the Order of the Red Banner of Labour
Recipients of the Order of the Red Star